The 1963 USC Trojans football team represented the University of Southern California (USC) in the 1963 NCAA University Division football season. In their fourth year under head coach John McKay, the Trojans compiled a 7–3 record (3–1 against conference opponents), finished in second place in the Athletic Association of Western Universities (AAWU or Big 6), and outscored their opponents by a combined total of 207 to 114.

Quarterback Pete Beathard was one of the team's two captains and led the team, completing 66 of 140 passes for 944 yards with five touchdowns and seven interceptions.  Mike Garrett led the team in rushing with 128 carries for 833 yards.  Team co-captain Willie Brown led the team in receiving with 34 catches for 448 yards.

Schedule

References

USC
USC Trojans football seasons
USC Trojans football